Juan Francisco Luis (July 10, 1940 – June 4, 2011) was a U.S. Virgin Islander politician who served as the third elected Governor of the United States Virgin Islands. He is the territory's 23rd governor overall. Luis assumed the governorship on January 2, 1978, succeeding Governor Cyril King, who died in office. He held the governor's office from 1978 until 1987, becoming the longest-serving governor in the history of the U.S. Virgin Islands.

Biography

Early years
Luis was born in 1940 on the neighboring island of Vieques in Puerto Rico. He moved with his family to Saint Croix—which has a sizeable Puerto Rican community—in the U.S. Virgin Islands when he was two months old. In 1958, Luis graduated from the former Christiansted High School as his class's valedictorian.

Luis studied at the Interamerican University of Puerto Rico. He moved back to Saint Croix after college, where he took a position as a sixth-grade teacher at the Christiansted Public Grammar School. He also worked as a project office manager for the Department of Housing and Urban Development before serving in the U.S. Army.

Luis was honorably discharged from the United States Army in 1968, holding the rank of sergeant. He returned to St. Croix after his discharge, where he married his wife, the former Luz Maria Guadalupe. He took a series of positions within the civil service and private sector until his election to office in 1972.  In 1968, Luis became a personnel administrative officer in the Virgin Islands Department of Health. Luis held several positions in the private sector from 1970 to 1972. He worked for Litwin Corporation as an industrial relations manager. Luis then joined Burns International as an accountant. Finally, Luis was employed as a personnel manager and comptroller at the Estate Carlton Hotel.

Luis and his wife, former U.S. Virgin Islands First Lady Luz Maria Luis, had two children, Juan Francisco Luis Jr. and Carlota Amalia.

Political career
Luis was elected to the 10th Legislature of the Virgin Islands, the territory's unicameral legislative body, in 1972, when he was 32 years old. He served one, two-year term as a Senator before seeking higher office in 1974.

Lieutenant governor
In 1974, two years after his election to the Legislature, gubernatorial candidate Cyril King persuaded Luis to join his ticket as his running mate for lieutenant governor. King had founded the Independent Citizens Movement (ICM) in the 1960s, so he and Luis ran for office as the nominees of the ICM.  King and Luis were elected as governor and lieutenant governor in a gubernatorial runoff election held in November 1974, defeating the Democratic ticket of Alexander Farrelly and Ruby Rouss.

Governor of the U.S. Virgin Islands
Governor Cyril King died in office of stomach cancer at Knud-Hansen Memorial Hospital at 8:06 p.m. on January 2, 1978. Luis, King's lieutenant governor, was sworn into office as the Governor of the U.S. Virgin Islands ten minutes after King's death to fill the remainder of his term.

On February 21, 1978, Governor Luis appointed banker Henry Millin, a Democrat, as his first lieutenant governor in an announcement broadcast on television and radio. Millin was sworn into office on March 10, 1978, at Government House on Saint Thomas. Millin became Luis' running mate in the 1978 gubernatorial election in November. Luis chose to run for governor as an independent candidate, dropping his previous political affiliation with the ICM in the election.

Governor Luis and Lt. Governor Millin were elected to a full four-year term on November 7, 1978. Luis defeated the Democratic ticket of Ron de Lugo, the-then Delegate of the U.S. Virgin Islands to the U.S. House of Representatives, and De Lugo's running mate, Senator Eric E. Dawson, in a tough election campaign. Luis won 10,978 votes, or 59.2%, while de Lugo placed second with 7,568 votes, or 40.8% of the total votes cast. Luis won all three major islands in the election, including a landslide win on Saint Croix.

Governor Luis and Lt. Governor Millin were inaugurated into a full, four-year term on Thursday, January 4, 1979, at a ceremony in Christiansted.

In 1982, Luis announced his campaign for re-election to a second full term. However, Lieutenant Governor Henry Millin chose to challenge Luis in the 1982 gubernatorial election. Luis needed a new running mate and he selected Julio Brady to replace Millin on the ticket.

Luis was re-elected to a second term on November 2, 1982, in a five-candidate race. Luis and Brady came in first with 11,354 votes and were declared the winners of the election. His closest challenger, Lt. Governor Henry Millin, placed second with 4,143 votes. However, the election was challenged in court by fourteen Virgin Islands residents, who argued that blank and spoiled ballots should be counted, which would necessitate a runoff election. By law, a gubernatorial candidate in the U.S. Virgin Islands must garner more than 50% of vote to avoid a runoff. Luis would have fallen just short of 50% if blank and spoiled ballots were counted. A lower court in the Virgin Islands agreed with those arguing for a runoff and ordered the blank and spoiled ballots to be counted, which brought Luis below 50%. However, the United States Court of Appeals for the Third Circuit in Philadelphia rejected the lower court ruling and allowed blank and spoiled ballots to be excluded, giving Luis an outright majority of the total votes cast. Thus, Luis won re-election to a second term without a runoff. Luis and Lt. Governor Julio Brady were sworn into a second term in January 1983.

Governor Luis created a new office, the federal programs coordinator, which worked to better coordinate federal funding and cultivate better relations with U.S. federal agencies, such as the Office of Insular Affairs.  Luis is credited by many, including current Governor John de Jongh, with the overhaul and creation of the U.S. Virgin Islands' present health care system during his time in office. Luis successfully lobbied for federal funding which was used to construct most of the U.S. Virgin Islands modern hospitals, including the Governor Juan F. Luis Hospital & Medical Center on Saint Croix, the Myrah Keating Smith Clinic on Saint John and the Schneider Regional Medical Center on Saint Thomas. In education, Luis abolished the practice of holding two separate sessions of school at the same school during the day.

Luis spearheaded the expansion of the Henry E. Rohlsen Airport on Saint Croix and the Cyril E. King Airport on Saint Thomas. He also oversaw the construction of other infrastructure projects, including the creation of a container terminal on Saint Croix. The first desalination plant was constructed by the V.I. Water and Power Authority during Luis' administration.

Governor Luis was also credited with launching the political careers of some of the U.S. Virgin Islands' most prominent politicians. They included former Senator Holland Redfield, whom he appointed to the Public Services Commission and encouraged to run for the Legislature in 1984, and Governor John de Jongh, whom Luis nominated to the V.I. Industrial Development Commission, which launched de Jongh's career in public service.

Luis was barred from seeking a third consecutive term in the 1986 gubernatorial election due to term limits. He was succeeded by Alexander Farrelly on January 5, 1987.

Later life
In 1990, Luis once again ran for election as governor. However, he was defeated by then Governor Alexander Farrelly, who won re-election.

Juan Francisco Luis was hospitalized at the Governor Juan F. Luis Hospital & Medical Center on St. Croix on June 3, 2011. He died at the hospital on June 4, 2011, at the age of 70. His funeral mass was held at the Holy Cross Catholic Church in Christiansted. Luis was buried at Kingshill Cemetery in Kingshill, U.S. Virgin Islands following a graveside service, which included a full military tribute by the Virgin Islands National Guard.

Luis was survived by his wife, former First Lady Luz Maria Guadalupe Luis; their children, Carlotta Amalia Luis and Juan Francisco Luis Jr.; his sister, Lydia Cintron-Monell; and two brothers, Carlos Monell and Esteban Monell Jr.

Luis died less than a week after the passing of another U.S. Virgin Islands political figure, former Lt. Governor Derek Hodge.

See also 
 List of minority governors and lieutenant governors in the United States
 List of Puerto Ricans

References

1940 births
2011 deaths
Democratic Party governors of the United States Virgin Islands
Governors of the United States Virgin Islands
Independent Citizens Movement politicians
Interamerican University of Puerto Rico alumni
Lieutenant Governors of the United States Virgin Islands
People from Saint Croix, U.S. Virgin Islands
People from Vieques, Puerto Rico
Senators of the Legislature of the United States Virgin Islands
United States Army soldiers
United States Virgin Islands military personnel
United States Virgin Islands people of Puerto Rican descent
Burials in the United States Virgin Islands